"Delicado" ("Delicate") is a popular song published in 1952 with music by Waldir Azevedo and lyrics by Jack Lawrence.
The song reached the top of the Billboard charts in 1952.

Notable versions
Oscar Alemán (1909-1980) recorded a version for guitar, released in Argentina in October of 1951. 
A version recorded by Percy Faith and his orchestra reached number one on the Billboard chart in 1952.
Dinah Shore with Henri Rene's Orchestra and Chorus recorded a successful cover version in 1952.
The Three Suns, 1952. 
Stan Kenton recorded a cover for his 1955 album, Popular Favorites by Stan Kenton. 
A version was recorded by the British bandleader and conductor Stanley Black in 1957.
Accordionist Dick Contino with David Carroll Orchestra on their 1962 album South American Holiday. 
Dr. John (Malcolm John "Mac" Rebennack Jr.) recorded a New Orleans-style version on Dr. John Plays Mac Rebennack Vol. 1 (1981).
Tito Cortés recorded a version which included lyrics.
Waldir Azevedo

See also
List of Billboard number-one singles of 1952

References

External links

 The Story Behind the Music

1952 singles
Percy Faith songs
Songs with lyrics by Jack Lawrence
Songs with music by Valdir Azevedo
Number-one singles in the United States
Brazilian songs
1952 songs
Carmen Miranda songs